School of Technology and Applied Sciences (STAS), formerly known as University College of Applied Sciences(UCAS), was established in the year 1993, by the Mahatma Gandhi University, Kerala. From 2017, the institution is under the direct administrative control of Centre for Professional and Advanced Studies (CPAS), a Government controlled society, headed by the Higher Education Minister of Kerala.

STAS has three regional centres, at Kottayam, Kochi and Pathanamthitta. The institution offers Bachelors and Postgraduate degrees in the areas of Computer Science, Computer Applications, Cyber Forensics  and Electronics.

References

STAS, Edappally
STAS, Pathanamthitta
STAS, Main Centre Kottayam

Colleges affiliated to Mahatma Gandhi University, Kerala